Bluewater Branch is a stream in Hickman County, Tennessee, in the United States.

Bluewater Branch was so named for the clear waters it contained before the surrounding fields were plowed.

See also
List of rivers of Tennessee

References

Rivers of Hickman County, Tennessee
Rivers of Tennessee